Oxylia argentata is a species of beetle in the family Cerambycidae. It was described by Édouard Ménétries in 1832, originally under the genus Saperda. It is known from Israel, the Ukraine, Iraq, Turkey, Armenia, and Syria.

Subspecies
 Oxylia argentata languida (Ménétries, 1838)
 Oxylia argentata argentata (Ménétries, 1832)

References

Saperdini
Beetles described in 1832